Marcin Flis (born 10 February 1994) is a Polish professional footballer who plays as a defender for Stal Mielec.

Club career
On 18 August 2020, he signed with Ekstraklasa club Stal Mielec. On 29 August 2022, after remaining a free agent since 30 June, he rejoined Stal on a one-year contract, with an extension option.

External links

References

1994 births
People from Lublin County
Sportspeople from Lublin Voivodeship
Living people
Polish footballers
Poland youth international footballers
Association football defenders
GKS Bełchatów players
Piast Gliwice players
GKS Katowice players
Górnik Łęczna players
Sandecja Nowy Sącz players
Stal Mielec players
Ekstraklasa players
I liga players